Gojko Nikoliš (11 August 1911 – 11 July 1995) was a physician, historian and a participant in the Spanish Civil War and World War II in Yugoslavia.

He was the first Head of the Partisan Medical Corps, Lieutenant General of the JNA, a member of the Serbian Academy of Sciences and Arts and was awarded the Order of the People's Hero.

In 1987, he was mentioned in the so-called Vojko i Savle affair.

Works
 "Development of the medical service in our army", Belgrade, 1947.
 "Sava Mrkalj - history of a single victim", "Prosvjeta", Zagreb, 1980.
 "Root, tree, pavement", "Liber" Zagreb, "Prosveta", Belgrade, 1981.
 "Records Under Pressure", Belgrade, 1988.

References

1911 births
1995 deaths
People from Gvozd
People from Karlovac
Serbs of Croatia
Yugoslav communists
Yugoslav Partisans members
Officers of the Yugoslav People's Army
Generals of the Yugoslav People's Army
Recipients of the Order of the People's Hero